Ot de Montcada was an early Catalan troubadour with no surviving work. Ot's work is known only from a reference in a sirventes of Guillem of Berguedan around 1175. By then he was considered old and out-dated. Guillem wrote his lyrics to the melody composed by Ot, who wrote it before the stone bell tower at Vic was erected:

It is possible that Ot was active before 1038, since in that year the cathedral of Vic was consecrated; it was considered aged in the mid-twelfth. This dating is uncertain, however, since Guillem may have meant no more than that Ot was very old.

References
Riquer, Martín de (1964). Història de la Literatura Catalana, vol. 1. Barcelona: Edicions Ariel.

12th-century Spanish troubadours
11th-century Catalan people